Mohammad Mahdi Nayebi  (born 11 March 1967Qazvin ) is an Iranian electrical engineer and Professor of Electrical Engineering at Sharif University of Technology.
He is known for his expertise on detection theory, estimation theory, radar signal processing, pattern recognition, electromagnetic compatibility and communications. Nayebi is a founder of Haamee Institute for Advancement of Humanities and Social Sciences and is featured in the documentary film Alberta Legacy.

Awards
Nayebi was awarded as the Exemplary Entrepreneur of the Country by Ministry of Cooperatives, Labour, and Social Welfare in 2006 and as the Exemplary Engineer of the Country by National Academy of Engineering in 2014.
Nayebi is also a Senior Member of the Institute of Electrical and Electronics Engineers.

References

External links
Mohammad Mahdi Nayebi at Sharif University of Technology

Iranian electrical engineers
Living people
1967 births
Senior Members of the IEEE
Sharif University of Technology alumni
Academic staff of Sharif University of Technology
Tarbiat Modares University alumni
People from Qazvin
Iranian businesspeople